Royston Edwin Scammell (28 July 1932 – 15 May 2021) was a British stuntman and actor.

Life and career
Scammell was born in July 1932 in Hendon, Middlesex, England. He died at Luton and Dunstable University Hospital in Luton, Bedfordshire in May 2021 at the age of 88.

Filmography

References

External links
 

1932 births
2021 deaths
English stunt performers
People from Hendon
20th-century English male actors
English male film actors
Male actors from London